The 1894–95 season was Manchester City F.C.'s fourth season of league football and third season in the Football League.

In their first season after Ardwick A.F.C.'s reformation as Manchester City, the team fared somewhat better than in their previous season, including recording a record league score of 11–3 at home against Lincoln City, though in this season City for the only time in their history declined to enter the FA Cup (the following season they entered but chose to withdraw later). The season also marks the first season with club legend Billy Meredith on the teamsheet - arguably City's first (chronologically) player of legendary status, and was the first season in which a player scored more than ten goals over the course of one season, partially because of the increasing size of the Football League's Second Division.

Team Kit

Football League Second Division

Results summary

Reports

Squad statistics

Squad
Appearances for competitive matches only

Scorers

All

League

See also
Manchester City F.C. seasons

References

External links
Extensive Manchester City statistics site

1894-95
English football clubs 1894–95 season